Mendota is a ghost town in Hamilton Township, Ellis County, Kansas, United States.

History
Initially named Halton, it was issued a post office in 1878. The name was changed to Mendota in 1882. The post office was discontinued in 1909.

References

Further reading

External links
 Ellis County maps: Current, Historic, KDOT

Former populated places in Ellis County, Kansas
Former populated places in Kansas